Dabney is an unincorporated community in Pulaski County, Kentucky, United States.

The Dabney Post Office, which closed in the 1960s, is listed on the National Register of Historic Places.

References

Unincorporated communities in Pulaski County, Kentucky
Unincorporated communities in Kentucky